Timothy S. Wright is an American curler from Prospect Heights, Illinois.

At the national level, he is a 1985 United States men's curling champion curler and 2001 United States mixed silver medallist.

Awards
Collie Campbell Memorial Award (1985)

Teams

Men's

Mixed

Personal life
He is married to fellow curler Amy Wright, US women's champion curler, together they were 2001 US mixed runner-ups.

References

External links

Living people
American male curlers
American curling champions
Date of birth missing (living people)
Place of birth missing (living people)
People from Prospect Heights, Illinois
Sportspeople from Cook County, Illinois
Year of birth missing (living people)